This is a list of electrical generating stations in Newfoundland and Labrador, Canada.

Newfoundland and Labrador has forty-eight power stations, and mainly rely on hydropower for its generation needs. The province's biggest power station, the 5,428-megawatt Churchill Falls Generating Station, mainly supplies Quebec, under a 65-year contract, due to expire in 2041.

Newfoundland Power, a subsidiary of St. John's-based Fortis Inc., is the retailer of electricity for most areas in the province. Newfoundland and Labrador Hydro, a subsidiary of government-owned Nalcor Energy, owns and operates most generation, the transmission grid and sells directly to large industrial customers. The company also serves remote communities not connected to the main power grids, in Newfoundland and in Labrador.

Hydroelectric 
List of hydroelectric power stations in Newfoundland and Labrador.

Wind 

List of all wind farms in Newfoundland and Labrador.

Other 
List of other power stations in Newfoundland and Labrador.

See also 
 Churchill Falls Labrador Corporation Limited
 Newfoundland Power
 Energy in Canada
 List of power stations in Canada
 Provincial Transmission Grid (Updated January 2011)

Notes

References

Lists of power stations in Canada